Jackson Pace (born February 19, 1999) is an American actor. He was a series regular in the Showtime television series Homeland, playing Chris Brody from 2011 to 2013. He also portrays Gage in the AMC zombie hit series The Walking Dead.

Life and career
Pace was born in Boca Raton, Florida. At three, he was featured in a commercial and was "hooked ever since". His first role was in 2006, on the television show Barney & Friends, playing Adam. He was featured in two episodes.

In 2007, he had a minor role in one episode on USA Network's Law & Order: Criminal Intent. In 2008, he appeared in the Lifetime television film Queen Sized, starring Nikki Blonsky. He played her younger brother.

In 2011, he was cast in the Showtime series Homeland as Chris Brody, the son of main character Nicholas Brody (Damian Lewis).

Filmography

References

External links

1999 births
21st-century American male actors
Male actors from Florida
American male child actors
American male film actors
American male television actors
Living people
People from Boca Raton, Florida